Transport Community is an international organisation in the field of mobility and transport, consisting of 36 participants – the European Union member states represented by the European Commission, the six Western Balkans regional partners (Albania, Bosnia and Herzegovina, Kosovo*, Montenegro, North Macedonia and Serbia) and the three observing participants (Georgia, Republic of Moldova and Ukraine). Transport Community's stated goal is integration of Western Balkans’ transport markets into the EU, by assisting the six Western Balkans partners to adopt and implement the EU legislation in the field of transport and by supporting projects that are connecting Western Balkans regional partners among themselves and with the EU. The organisation was founded by the Treaty establishing the Transport Community signed on 9th of October 2017 by all partners (Council Decision (EU) 2019/392). The aim of the Treaty therefore is the creation of a Transport Community in the field of road, rail, inland waterway and maritime transport as well as the development of the transport network between the European Union and the six Western Balkan Parties. Its members are European Union and the six Western Balkan parties namely Albania, Bosnia and Herzegovina, Kosovo, North Macedonia, Montenegro and Serbia. In December 2017 Belgrade was unanimously elected as the seat of the Community's Permanent Office. The permanent office was open in September 2019.

References
References:

Notes:

See also
https://www.transport-community.org/
Berlin Process
Southeast Europe
Stabilisation and Association Process
Central European Free Trade Agreement
Stability Pact for South Eastern Europe
Mini-Schengen area

International relations in Southeastern Europe
Intergovernmental organizations
Organizations based in Belgrade
International organizations based in Serbia